The Taihang Mountains are a Chinese mountain range running down the eastern edge of the Loess Plateau in Shanxi, Henan and Hebei provinces. The principal peak is Mount Xiaowutai. The Taihang's eastern peak is Mount Cangyan in Hebei; Baishi Mountain forms its northern tip. 

The Taihang Mountains were formed during the Jurassic. Brown forest and cinnamon soils are found here.

The name of Shanxi Province, meaning "west of the mountains", derives from its location west of the Taihang Mountains. The name of Shandong Province (east of the mountains) originally applied to the area east of the Xiao Mountains, but by the Tang dynasty it refers to the area east of the Taihang Mountains; this entity evolved into the modern-day Shandong Province, though the actual border of the province has moved considerably to the east.

The Hai River system runs through the Taihang Mountains. The Red Flag Canal is located on the south edge of the Taihang Mountains.

The Shijiazhuang–Taiyuan high-speed railway crosses under the Taihang Mountains via the Taihang Tunnel, which, at almost , is the third longest railway tunnel in China.

See also
Taihangshan Gorge of China

References

Many references to this range in “Fanshen” by William Hinton, with their significance in the Chinese Socialist revolution.

External links

 

Mountain ranges of China
Landforms of Hebei
Landforms of Henan
Mountain ranges of Shanxi
North China Plain